The 2019 Liga 3 Regional Round was played from 18 November to 5 December 2019. A total of 81 teams competed in the regional round to decide 26 of the 32 places in the national round of the 2019 Liga 3.

Teams
The following 81 teams entered the regional winner route divided into seven regions:
 

Notes:
 BOLD: Winner of each provincial league.

Regional round

Sumatra
A total of 20 teams played in Sumatra regional round. Six best teams from this region advanced to national round. This region was played from 19 November – 5 December 2019.

|+First round

|+Second round

Java
A total of 35 teams played in Java regional round. Twelve best teams from this region advanced to national round. This region was played from 18 November – 3 December 2019.

|+First round

|+Second round

Kalimantan
A total of seven teams played in Kalimantan regional round. Two best teams from this region advanced to national round. This region was played from 18 November – 2 December 2019.

|+First round

|+Second round

Sulawesi
A total of 11 teams played in Sulawesi regional round. Three best teams from this region advanced to national round. This region was played from 18 November – 2 December 2019.

|+First round

|+Second round

Lesser Sunda Islands
A total of four teams played in Lesser Sunda Islands regional round. The best teams from this region advanced to national round. This region was played from 18 November – 2 December 2019.

|+First round

|+Second round

Maluku
A total of two teams played in Maluku regional round. The best teams from this region advanced to national round. This region was played from 21–30 November 2019.

Papua
A total of two teams played in Papua regional round. The best teams from this region advanced to national round. This region was played from 22 November – 1 December 2019.

Qualified teams

The following teams qualified from regional route for the national round.

References

External links
 2019 Liga 3 fixtures at PSSI website

2019 Liga 3 (Indonesia)
Liga 3